Daridra yogas or Nirdhanta yogas along with Kemadruma yoga and Shakat yoga, are certain exceptional ava-yogas or unfavourable planetary combinations that indicate poverty. The word, Daridra (Sanskrit: दरिद्र) means poor, needy or deprived, and the word, Nirdhanta (Sanskrit: निर्धनता) means poverty, poorness or indigence.

Overview

Ava-yogas indicating poverty basically involve an affliction to the 2nd house or bhava and/or its lord, and to Jupiter and the lord of the 11th. Kemadruma yoga is also caused when the Moon is in the 2nd or in the 12th house and no planet occupies the bhavas either side the Moon; the Shakat yoga is caused when Jupiter occupies the 6th or the 8th house from the Moon, in which both events there will be lack of wealth and much difficulty in making a living or gaining in prosperity. The good bad effects of Daridra yogas are felt during the adverse dashas or planetary periods of the afflicted lords of wealth and gains, and certain Daridra yogas operate from birth till death. There is an ancient dictum that reads – If the Moon occupies either the 6th or the 8th from the lagna and Saturn occupies the 7th house then all that one possesses will soon be lost.

Rationale

The association of the bhava-lord and the bhava-karaka is essential in any yoga-formation for the sake of bringing out the best results signified by that bhava, both should be vested with requisite strength and be unafflicted. The 2nd house counted from the lagna is the Dhanabhava, the house of wealth and Jupiter is the Dhanakaraka.  Affliction caused by cruel planets, by the designated or functional malefics and the Marakas (death inflicting planets) to the 2nd house and its lord and to Jupiter results in poverty of varying degree. Jatakalankara states that if the lord of the Dhanabhava is combined with Jupiter in the 2nd house or in a kendrasthana there will be acquisition of much wealth but if they conjoin in a trikathana then acute poverty and misfortune will result.

The location of cruel planets in the kendras from the Moon portends bad results if not evil results. If Saturn is in a kendra from the lagna occupied by the Moon and Jupiter is in the 12th house a person begs for alms and in frustration abandons his or her place or country of birth. Ava-yogas involving inauspicious bhavas and their lords affect the outcome of efforts and undertakings. The Sun owns the 12th house for Virgo lagna, it should not join Venus in the 2nd house or the Moon in the 12th in which case there may not be easy earnings, inflow and retention of wealth, and the person becomes bereft of wealth and suffers from loss of wealth; the Sun, the Moon and Venus conjoining make one clever in grabbing others’ wealth. Natural malefic tenanting evil bhavas do tend to cause worry, pain and suffering more so when they are the lords of auspicious bhavas; for Taurus lagna Saturn, the functional benefic, the yoga-karaka and friend of the lagna-lord, situated in the 8th or the 12th house from the lagna does not promote domestic peace and causes loss of wealth. The respective lords of the 2nd and the 11th house both associating with Jupiter make one very wealthy; they should also preferably be influenced by the lord of a trikonabhava which bhavas are the significators of good fortune, prosperity and great wealth. Any association of the lords of the 2nd, the 11th, the 5th and the 9th bhavas, strong and mutually inclined, indicates gain of wealth. According to Jataka Parijata any exalted planet or a planet occupying its exaltation navamsa if aspecting the Moon makes a person neither covet nor possess wealth even though Saravali states that the Moon aspected by the exalted lord of the lagna gives rise to Raja yoga. The lord of the 8th occupying the 2nd house from the lagna will make a person witness his or her wealth decline or get squandered.

Parasara tells Maitreya that a person blessed with benefic yogas remains unfortunate if the birth is on an Amavasya, Krishnapaksha Chaturthi, Surya-sankranti, Mahapata, Solar or Lunar eclipse, Vyatipata, Ashubha yoga, Gandanta, Yamaghanta, Dagdha yoga, Tithikshaya, the Sun is debilitated or with same Janam nakshatra of father or mother or as the 4th issue after the birth of three sisters or three brothers. Persons thus born lead a poor life and also make their parents poor.

Constitution

When the lords of the lagna, the 2nd and the 11th house are combined with or aspected by malefic planets or have connection with the trikabhavas or their lords then one invariably experiences acute shortage of funds, loss of wealth and incurrence of debts. If the 2nd house from the lagna is occupied by a malefic and the lord of the 2nd house is combined with or aspected by malefic one speaks rudely and earns livelihood with much difficulty. If the 2nd house is occupied by malefic, the lord of the 2nd house is devoid of strength and the lord of the lagna is in a trikabhava conjoined with malefic one knows no comforts in life.

The lord of the 11th house relegated to the 3rd, the 6th, the 8th or the 12th indicates loss of wealth and poverty. The lord of the 11th or the 12th occupying the 8th house uninfluenced by benefics indicates poverty. If the lord of the 4th or the 9th house or both combine with the lord of the 8th in any bhava and the lord of the 2nd house is debilitated, if the lord of the lagna is debilitated and the lagna and the 2nd house are occupied by malefic, if the lord of the lagna is in the 6th house and the lords of the 2nd, the 6th or the 8th are natural malefics, if the 2nd house is heavily afflicted and is not aspected by any benefic or if the lords of the 9th and the 10th occupy the 8th house either conjoined with or aspected by the lord of the 8th in all such cases one is bound to suffer the pangs of poverty.

If the lords of the lagna and the 12th or the lords of the lagna and the 6th are in mutual exchange of signs and aspected by either the 2nd or the 7th house lord, if Ketu is in the lagna or with the Moon and the lord of the lagna is in the 8th house aspected by a maraka, if the lord of the lagna owns a trikabhava and is aspected by malefic or conjoined with Saturn and is devoid of benefic associations, if the lagna is occupied by a malefic aspected by a maraka or a maraka combined with a malefic occupies the lagna, if the lords of the trikabhavas occupy their own bhavas afflicted by a cruel planet, if the planet associating with a trika-lord is not aspected by the lord of the lagna, the 5th or the 9th, or if the Atmakaraka or the lord of the lagna aspect the Atmakaraka  then one certainly remains or becomes poor.

If the 2nd house is occupied by a malefic and malefics also tenant the kendrasthanas or if Mars is in the 8th house and the Sun is in Libra sign in a trikonabhava then one ekes out a living as a beggar.

Phaladeepika states that if the lagna and its karaka is afflicted by malefics and its lord occupies a trikasthana the person leads an ordinary life, is very poor and insulted by others, if the 2nd house and its karaka is afflicted by malefics and its lord occupies a trikasthana one does not possess anything and remains poor, and his wealth if any is taken away by his enemies, if the 4th house and its karaka is afflicted by malefics and its lord occupies a trikasthana one leads a life devoid of happiness and old age is troublesome, and if the 9th house and its karaka is afflicted by malefices and its lord occupies a trikasthana the one is sloven and sad and the property that is inherited is destroyed.

Role of Marakas

Planets associated with the lord of the 6th, the 8th the 12th or a marakasthana causes suffering, misery and financial strain. Planets associated with the lord of a trikabhava and simultaneously with marakas bereft of influence of the lords of the 5th and 9th bhavas or the lagna-lord occupying the 12th house and the lord of the 12th situated in the lagna influenced by marakas or the lord of the lagna in the 6th house and the lord of the 6th in the lagna influenced by marakas or the lagna or the Moon afflicted by maracas or the lagna occupied by Ketu and the lord of the lagna situated in the 8th or the lord of the 5th in the 6th and the lord of the 9th situated in the 12th house influenced by marakas or malefics other than the lords of the 9th and the 10th house situated in the lagna influenced by marakas or the lord of the navamsa occupied by Moon or the lagna-lord located in a trikabhava associated with a maraka produce poverty and intense misery, and indicate loss or destruction of wealth, and troublesome period during the course of their antra-dasa or dasa.

Cancellation

The general perception is that the bhava occupied by a malefic becomes defective, and thus, a malefic situated in the 11th, the house of gains, causes Daridra yoga. But, Saravali states that all planets whether benefic or malefic endow one with wealth and fortunes. Therefore, a planet situated in the 11th house cancels the adversities indicated by Daridra yogas. The same result also applies to aspect on the 11th house but only a strong Moon, Mars or Saturn aspecting the 11th house gives wealth, if they are weak their aspect will result in poverty.

References

Yogas
Sanskrit words and phrases